Ernest Frankish (4 July 1876 – 22 January 1962) was a New Zealand cricketer. He played in five first-class matches for Canterbury from 1903 to 1906.

See also
 List of Canterbury representative cricketers

References

External links
 

1876 births
1962 deaths
New Zealand cricketers
Canterbury cricketers
Cricketers from Christchurch